Ridge Wood Heights is a census-designated place (CDP) in Sarasota County, Florida, United States. The population was 4,795 at the 2010 United States Census. It is part of the Bradenton–Sarasota–Venice Metropolitan Statistical Area.

Geography

Demographics

As of the census of 2000, there were 5,028 people, 2,225 households, and 1,301 families residing in the CDP. The racial makeup of the CDP was 95.80% White, 0.78% African American, 0.42% Native American, 0.95% Asian, 0.06% Pacific Islander, 1.03% from other races, and 0.95% from two or more races. Hispanic or Latino of any race were 4.30% of the population.

There were 2,225 households, out of which 27.0% had children under the age of 18 living with them, 42.3% were married couples living together, 11.9% had a female householder with no husband present, and 41.5% were non-families. 31.1% of all households were made up of individuals, and 9.1% had someone living alone who was 65 years of age or older.  The average household size was 2.26 and the average family size was 2.84.

In the CDP, the population was spread out, with 21.9% under the age of 18, 6.5% from 18 to 24, 32.5% from 25 to 44, 26.0% from 45 to 64, and 13.1% who were 65 years of age or older. The median age was 40 years. For every 100 females, there were 100.1 males. For every 100 females age 18 and over, there were 96.6 males.

The median income for a household in the CDP was $42,376, and the median income for a family was $49,010. Males had a median income of $31,114 versus $26,888 for females. The per capita income for the CDP was $20,095.  About 4.1% of families and 6.0% of the population were below the poverty line, including 6.6% of those under age 18 and 3.7% of those age 65 or over.

As of 2010 Ridge Wood Heights had a population of 4,795.  The ethnic and racial composition of the population was 93.0% white, 1.6% black or African American, 0.4% Native American, 1.5% Asian, 0.04% native Hawaiian or other Pacific Islander, 1.5% some other race, and 2.0% from two or more races. Hispanic or Latino people of any race constituted 8.5% of the population.

References

Census-designated places in Sarasota County, Florida
Sarasota metropolitan area
Census-designated places in Florida